Aagot Norman (29 July 1892 – 22 February 1979) was a Norwegian swimmer. She set two Norwegian records in 100m freestyle at the short course and she attended the 100m freestyle during the 1912 Summer Olympics. This was the first time swimming was on the program for women. She did not finish during the first round.

Norwegian national records by Aagot Norman

References

External links
Aagot Norman – Olympic athlete profile at Sports-Reference.com

1892 births
1979 deaths
Sportspeople from Bergen
Norwegian female freestyle swimmers
Swimmers at the 1912 Summer Olympics
Olympic swimmers of Norway